Anona Winn  (born Anona Edna Wilkins, 5 January 1904 – 2 February 1994) was an Australian-born actress, broadcaster and singer, who spent most of her career in the UK.

Career
Born in Sydney, she studied at the Redland College For Girls in Sydney She then studied piano and eventually opera at the Sydney Conservatorium of Music and Melba Memorial Conservatorium of Music, which the latter was possible due to a scholarship from Dame Nellie Melba. Melba, who convinced her to change her name to Winn, also called her a "human flute" due to her massive range. She became disillusioned with the training, calling it the "strait-jacket of opera training", though she was thankful for Melba's guidance. She would join a touring company of The Merry Widow, but after finding it hard to be a successful singer, she would become a journalist. After playing parts varying from pantomime to Shakespeare in a repertory company, she moved to England.  She played the leading part for 8 weeks in "Hit The Deck". Within a few years she had made more than 300 appearances in various radio shows including the BBC's Just a Minute. Winn was a regular in the BBC Radio version of Twenty Questions and Petticoat Line.

In 1933, she married Frederick Lamport. Winn was made an MBE in 1954. She died in Bournemouth aged 90.

Film credits

 1934  On the Air

References

Further reading
 Moanin' Low: A Discography of Female Popular Vocal Recordings, 1920–1933 By Ross Laird
 Anona Winn – Life On The Wireless by Karen Winters.  Memory Lane magazine Issue 162 Spring 2009
 Obituary: Anona Winn (by June Averill). Independent, 18 Feb 1994.

External links

1904 births
1994 deaths
Members of the Order of the British Empire
Actresses from Sydney
Australian expatriates in the United Kingdom